Allie Bates (born May 1957, in Memphis) is an American short story writer who has also written Romance and Science Fiction novels and screenplays. She is also an English teacher and freelance editor.

Biography
Bates received her BA in creative writing from the University of Memphis, and her master's degree from the University of Memphis College of Education. In the early days of the Internet, she worked in Writer's Ink and Macintosh BBS on GEnie. She has written for Woman's World, Byline Magazine, Marion Zimmer Bradley's Fantasy Magazine, Writers on the River and Softdisk Magazine among others. She has written under the name Allie Bates and under other pseudonyms; and has ghostwritten books, screenplays, speeches and blogs.

She has won and/or placed in numerous writing competitions, such as the Tupelo Gumtree Festival Short Fiction Competition, NOLA's Novel Beginnings, Deep South Writer's Competition. Bates has edited for New Age Dimensions Publishing, Dark Romance Novel Group, Zumaya Press, as well as for several corporate clients.  Her medieval novel Earthchild  was well received.  She worked in development on the movie Florida Road, for director Brad Glass.

Novelspot
Currently, she writes reviews for Novelspot.net an online magazine, and has written for other review sites in the past. The initial core of Novelspot is currently made up of Bates, Steve Lazarowitz, and Theresa Rhodes. Novelspot's noteworthy contributors include Mike Resnick, Diana Gabaldon and hundreds of others. In 2007, Novelspot was recognized by Writer's Digest as one of the top 101 sites for writers.

References

External links
 Novelspot
 Florida Road
 Tupelo Gumtree Festival
 Bio

21st-century American novelists
American romantic fiction writers
American women novelists
American women short story writers
1957 births
Living people
Women romantic fiction writers
21st-century American short story writers
21st-century American women writers